William "Pat" Schuber (born April 15, 1947) is an American Republican Party politician who served as Mayor of Bogota, represented the 38th legislative district in the New Jersey General Assembly and served 12 years as the Bergen County Executive

Background
Born on April 15, 1947, Schuber graduated from Bogota High School.

Schuber received a BA from Fordham University and was awarded a JD from the Fordham University School of Law. He has been a senior lecturer on the faculty of Fairleigh Dickinson University

Political offices
Schuber served for four years as Mayor of Bogota, represented the 38th legislative district in the New Jersey General Assembly from 1982 to 1990 and served 12 years as the Bergen County Executive.

Port Authority of New York and New Jersey
Schuber was appointed to a six-year term on the board of commissioners of the Port Authority of New York and New Jersey (PANYNJ) by Governor of New Jersey Chris Christie in July 2011. He is one of several PANYNJ personnel subpoenaed by the New Jersey Legislature panel investigating the Fort Lee lane closure scandal. Testimony given in September 2016 by federal prosecution witness David Wildstein claims that Schuber was aware the lane closures were planned. In February 2017, it was announced that Kevin J. O'Toole would succeed him as commissioner.

See also
 Governorship of Chris Christie
 List of people involved in the Fort Lee lane closure scandal

References

|-

Living people
1947 births
Fairleigh Dickinson University faculty
Fordham University School of Law alumni
Politicians from Bergen County, New Jersey
Republican Party members of the New Jersey General Assembly
People from Bogota, New Jersey
Port Authority of New York and New Jersey people
Mayors of places in New Jersey
Bergen County, New Jersey executives